Debeni (in older sources also V Debenih) is a small settlement in the Municipality of Gorenja Vas–Poljane  in the Upper Carniola region of Slovenia.

References

External links 

Debeni on Geopedia

Populated places in the Municipality of Gorenja vas-Poljane